Vila Salazar may refer to:

N'dalatando, Angola (the former official name of the city is ‘Vila Salazar’)
Sango, Zimbabwe (the former official name of the village is ‘Vila Salazar’)
Baucau, East Timor (the former official name of the city is ‘Vila Salazar’)